La Fabuleuse Aventure de Marco Polo or Marco the Magnificent is a 1965 international co-production (Afghanistan, Yugoslavia, Egypt, France, Italy) adventure film directed by Denys de La Patellière and Noël Howard. Raoul Levy committed suicide after losing most of his fortune financing this film.

Cast
Horst Buchholz as Marco Polo
Anthony Quinn as Kublai Khan, Mongol Emperor of China
Omar Sharif as Sheik Alla Hou, 'The Desert Wind'
Orson Welles as Akerman, Marco's tutor
Akim Tamiroff as the Old Man of the Mountain
Elsa Martinelli as the woman with the whip
Robert Hossein as Prince Nayam, a Mongol rebel leader
Grégoire Aslan as Achmed Abdullah
Massimo Girotti as Niccolò, Marco's father
Folco Lulli as Spinello, a Venetian merchant
Guido Alberti as Pope Gregory X
Lynne Sue Moon as Princess Gogatine (credited as Lee Sue Moon)
Bruno Cremer as Guillaume de Tripoli, a Knight Templar
Jacques Monod as Nicolo de Vicenza, a Knight Templar
Mića Orlović as Matteo, Marco's uncle

References

External links
 

1965 films
1960s historical adventure films
French epic films
French historical adventure films
Italian epic films
Italian historical adventure films
Yugoslav drama films
Egyptian drama films
Afghan drama films
1960s French-language films
1960s Italian-language films
Films directed by Denys de La Patellière
Films set in the 13th century
Films set in the 14th century
Films set in the Yuan dynasty
Films set in China
Films set in Italy
Cultural depictions of Marco Polo
Cultural depictions of Kublai Khan
Films with screenplays by Jean-Paul Rappeneau
1960s English-language films
English-language French films
English-language Italian films
English-language Yugoslav films
English-language Egyptian films
English-language Afghan films
Films set in the Mongol Empire
1960s Italian films
1960s French films